Dark Zone may refer to:

Dark Zone, a universe in the Lexx television series
The Dark Zone, fourth book in the Galahad series by Dom Testa
Dark Zone, a concept in the Futari wa Pretty Cure anime series
The Dark Zone, the Quake map (DM6) setting of the 1996 film Diary of a Camper
Dark Zones, concepts in the video game Tom Clancy's The Division
"Dark Zone", an episode of the History Channel show Shadow Force
Dark Zone, a 2011 novel by Yusuke Kishi
 In immunology, the proliferative compartment of the germinal center reaction 
 “Dark Zone”, a webcomic created by Micah_ers